Sygkrasi or Syngrasis is a village in the Famagusta District of Cyprus, located 3 km east of Lapathos. It is under the de facto control of Northern Cyprus.

References

Communities in Famagusta District
Populated places in İskele District